Liverpool City Police was the police force operating in the city of Liverpool, England, established in 1836.
In 1967, the force merged with Bootle Borough Police to create the Liverpool and Bootle Constabulary.

References

Defunct police forces of England
History of Liverpool
History of Merseyside